Surcouf (F711) is a  of the French Navy. Construction began at Lorient Naval Dockyard on 6 July 1992, launched 3 July 1993, and the ship was commissioned May 1996. Since entering service, Surcouf has taken part in numerous missions, notably in Operation Antilope (Gabon and Congo), Operation Trident (Kosovo) and Mission Khor Anga in the Djibouti zone.

Service history
On 14 May 2001, Surcouf rendered assistance to Marc Guillemot, skipper of Biscuits La Trinitaine-Team Ethypharm, who had to abandon his ship after her starboard hull was seriously damaged.  The catamaran's crew of five were airlifted to safety by helicopter.

On 14 October 2004, Surcouf assisted Sara 2, a Panamanian cargo ship which ran aground near Yemen. The 16-man crew was successfully airlifted by the Panther helicopter, and later transferred from the frigate to the Yemeni coast guard.

Between 17 and 21 May 2008, Surcouf  participated in Exercise KhunjarHaad, a multi-national exercise held in the Gulf of Oman.  Other participating warships included the American destroyer , the British frigate , the British fleet replenishment tanker  and four other coalition ships conducted air defense; surface warfare operation; visit, board, search and seizure (VBSS); and joint gunnery exercises, which focused on joint interoperability training and proficiency.

In November 2012 Surcouf deployed to the Horn of Africa as part of the European Union's Naval Operation in the area. A British Lynx HMA.8 helicopter of 815 Squadron was on board for the whole four-month deployment, along with 12 personnel including 2 Royal Marine snipers.  This was the first extended deployment of a Royal Navy helicopter on a French warship and was the result of a treaty between the United Kingdom and France to share military resources and conduct more joint operations. 

During a 2017-18 refit, the frigate was equipped with a Thales Bluewatcher sonar as part of a two-year trial that was subsequently extended through 2022. Surcouf was the first La Fayette-class ship to receive an active sonar capability.

In 2021, Surcouf deployed to the Pacific accompanying the French Navy helicopter assault ship .

In April 2022, Surcouf, with a Panther helicopter embarked, again deployed to the Indian Ocean to relieve her sister ship .
 
From 26 until 30 May 2022, Surcouf trained with the Kuwait Naval Force.

Surcouf is scheduled to undergo a modest structural and technical upgrade (with the elderly Crotale SAM to be removed from the vessel) and, given somewhat reduced general purpose capability, be re-assigned to offshore patrol duties prior to her planned withdrawal from service in 2027.

References

Sources 

 Frégate Surcouf

La Fayette-class frigates
Frigates of France
1993 ships
Ships built in France